Vitali Vladimirovich Prokhorov; born December 25, 1966, in Moscow, Soviet Union) is a retired professional hockey player who played briefly with the St. Louis Blues in the NHL. He played left wing and shot left-handed.

Prokhorov began his playing career in his native USSR. He played for Spartak Moscow for 9 seasons from 1983 until 1992. He also played for the USSR in the 1991 Canada Cup and for Russia in the 1992 Winter Olympics and the 1992 Ice Hockey World Championship. Following the breakup of the Soviet Union many Russian players attempted to come to North America to play in the NHL. Prokhorov was no exception, and he was drafted by the St. Louis Blues in the 3rd round, 64th overall in the 1992 NHL Entry Draft. He along with Vitali Karamnov and Igor Korolev created a "Moscow Express Line" that was expected to bring a big scoring punch to the Blues.

For the 1992–1993 season however things did not go well for Prokhorov. After a slow start, Prokhorov suffered a shoulder injury that limited him to only 26 games the whole year. He did have a bright spot during the season however when he scored a hat trick against the Philadelphia Flyers on October 31, 1992. After starting the 1993–1994 season with the Peoria Rivermen Prokhorov played 55 games with the Blues, scoring 25 points. The following season Prokhorov played 20 games with the Rivermen and only 2 games with the Blues before being released.

Following his stint in the NHL Prokhorov played the 1995–1996 season in Sweden and 4 more seasons in Russia before retiring from hockey in 2001.

Career statistics

Regular season and playoffs

International

External links
 

1966 births
Living people
Ak Bars Kazan players
Färjestad BK players
HC CSKA Moscow players
HC Davos players
HC Khimik Voskresensk players
HC Lada Togliatti players
HC Spartak Moscow players
HC Vityaz players
Ice hockey players at the 1992 Winter Olympics
Medalists at the 1992 Winter Olympics
Metallurg Magnitogorsk players
Olympic gold medalists for the Unified Team
Olympic ice hockey players of the Unified Team
Olympic medalists in ice hockey
Peoria Rivermen (IHL) players
Russian ice hockey left wingers
St. Louis Blues draft picks
St. Louis Blues players
Soviet ice hockey left wingers
Ice hockey people from Moscow
Russian expatriate sportspeople in the United States
Russian expatriate sportspeople in Sweden
Russian expatriate sportspeople in Switzerland
Expatriate ice hockey players in the United States
Expatriate ice hockey players in Sweden
Expatriate ice hockey players in Switzerland
Russian expatriate ice hockey people